Agadadash Samedov is an Azerbaijani veteran who fought in the Great Patriotic War as a Soviet soldier.

Career 
Samedov was born on 10 March 1924 in the Lenkeran District of the Azerbaijan SSR, within the Soviet Union. During World War II, Samedov helped liberate the North Caucasus, Ukraine and other European countries from the Axis powers. In 1942, on Ukrainian territory near Dubno, he remained alone after his squadron had already retreated, defending against the approaching forces. For this feat he received the Order of Glory, 3rd degree. Agadadash Samedov also participated in the Vistula–Oder Offensive and the Battle of Berlin.

On 6 June 1945, Samedov was awarded the Order of Glory (2nd degree) for courage and bravery displayed in the Great Patriotic War.

Honors 
 Order of Glory (2nd and 3rd degree)

Personal life 
He has 13 children, 44 grandchildren and 36 great grandchildren.

References 

1924 births
Living people
Recipients of the Order of Glory
Soviet military personnel of World War II from Azerbaijan